Fareb (English: Deceit) is a 1996 Indian psychological thriller film directed by Vikram Bhatt. The film features newcomers Faraaz Khan and Suman Ranganathan with Milind Gunaji. It was released on 28 June 1996. The film is a remake of the inspired from 1992 film Unlawful Entry.

Plot
The film opens up in J.S Medical College, Pune, where the principal calls Dr. Rohan Verma and tells him that he has received a gold medal, a bungalow, a car and a chief surgeon post in Bombay. Verma and his wife Suman, a school teacher, both reach their new house in Bombay. One year later, while they are asleep, they hear a voice. Verma starts searching the house when suddenly a burglar attacks him. Suman calls for the police, but the burglar escapes. Two policemen, Inspector Indrajeet Saxena aka Inder and Inspector Sule arrive to investigate and tell them to file a report. While in school, a peon places drugs in Suman's handbag. Inspector Sule tells her that she has to be arrested in a drugs case, but Inspector Inder informs her that she is free to go as the drugs were put by the peon and he has confessed. The peon is shown dead on the floor with blood on his face.

Dr. Verma invites Inspector Inder to their home for dinner. Inder arrives with Sule. While they are partying, Inder starts asking them about children, to which both get depressed. Next day, Inder invites Verma to a men-only party, where they meet a prostitute named Vrinda. It is revealed that Inder takes her services on random basis however she is sexually attracted to him. But Inder dismisses her advances. After the party, Inder takes Verma to an area where only criminals live. He goes inside and brings a man—the same person who came as a burglar in Verma's house. Inder asks Verma to take his revenge, but Verma refuses and says that he cannot take the life of any person. To this, Inder frees the burglar, but shoots him while he is escaping. Verma reaches home and tells his wife that Inder is a psycho and that she should maintain a distance from him. To this, Suman tells him that whatever Inder did was right. The next day, Inder meets Suman and justifies his actions saying that the burglar deserved this punishment. Inder then arrives at a party, given in honour of Dr. Verma. Verma tells him to leave, but he refuses. Inder has now become totally obsessive of Verma's wife. After the party Suman and Rohan shares a brief argument over Inder's obsession towards Suman. But Suman dismisses Rohan's concerns and finds Inder's behaviour normal. The same night Inder calls over Vrinda in his van and has sex with her. Vrinda tells her that she doesn't want to take money from him as she feels sexually satisfied with him. Hearing upon this, Inder throws her out of his van and leaves her semi-naked on a secluded street alone. Next day, Inder goes to Suman's school and gains the trust of her students. He then befriends with Suman and asks her the reason for not having a child. Suman tells him that two years earlier, while she was pregnant, she fell down the stairs. Rohan was busy in an emergency duty and could not come to the hospital to see her and she lost the child. She regrets that if Rohan had come that day, they would not have lost the child.

Inder is sure now that Suman wants him as she needs a child. The next night, Inder calls Vrinda the prostitute again to his house and ask her to behave like Suman, Inder had already given Instructions to Vrinda and told her about Suman's situation. Confused and perplexed about Inder's abnormal behaviour Vrinda reluctantly participates in the sexual act. Inder shows off his possessive side calling Vrinda Suman repeatedly during the act however, Vrinda slips out Inder's name by mistake and calls him 'Raja' when she is about to reach an orgasm. Angered and Furious upon hearing this, Inder goes totally mad and starts to beat Vrinda brutally. After beating her he throws her out of his house not before telling her that one day the real Suman shall be on his bed madly in love with him. Vrinda calls upon Inder's friend Inspector Sule to complain against Inder but he ask her not to do so however the next morning he warns Inder to stop interfering in the life of Dr. Verma and Suman and that if he continues to do that, he will report this matter to the ACP. Inder ignores the warning and disconnects the telephone and electricity connection of Verma's house. At night, he enters Verma's house where Rohan and Suman are having sex. While finding Inder at such an uninviting position at his house, Rohan gets furious and along with his lawyer goes to the ACP to lodge a complaint against Inder.

Meanwhile, Inder has become totally possessive of Suman and wants to spend all of his time with her. On her birthday he launches a fake complaint against Rohan with a fake name and address and gets him interrogated at the Police Station. Moreover, his car also get seized by the police on the basis of another police complaint. Inder disconnects the phone so that Rohan could not reach Suman thus fails to reach home at time and this makes Suman upset. At the police Station the ACP refuses to believe Rohan's claims against Inder as he is considered to be the finest police officer in their department however after Rohan's pleading ACP takes his written complaint. This reaches out to Suley and he warns Inder again. Inder who now wants Suman at all cost decides to hatch a plan against Rohan by framing him in a drug case. He plants drugs on his house and gets him arrested. On the other hand, he kills both prostitute Vrinda and Suley thus making them allies of Rohan and partners in his crime. Inder meets Rohan in jail and tells him that the night has come where he will finally have his dreamy sex act with Suman. In order to save Suman, Rohan tricks the police by consuming a pill which makes him immediately sick. Somehow, he manages to break free from the jail

The following night, Inder reaches Suman's house and kills Suman's best friend Neeta who came to accompany her for the night. Suman realizes that someone has broken into her house and It's no one else than Inder. Inder, who has become totally possessive of Suman and revealing his psychotic behaviour asks her to give in to his sexual needs. After a brief Cat and Mouse game, Suman gets her hold of Inder's gun and tries to shoot him but it turns out to be empty. Enraged by this, Inder slaps Suman and begins to rape her. However, Rohan breaks into the house and attacks Inder. Inder knocks out Rohan several times and even shoots him. He again makes his way to rape Suman but this time Rohan stabs Inder with broken glass, making him lose his control over his body. Rohan fatally shoots Inder with his own gun. Suman and Rohan re-unite with a hug.

Cast
Faraaz Khan as Dr. Rohan Verma
Suman Ranganathan as Suman Verma
Milind Gunaji as Inspector Indrajeet Saxena
Vishwajeet Pradhan as Inspector Sule
Makrand Deshpande as Thief
Kunika as Prostitute Vrinda
Ashok Lath as Vishal (lawyer)
Sunil Dhawan
Divya Jaiswal as Neeta

Soundtrack
The film's score and soundtrack is composed by Jatin–Lalit, with lyrics by Neeraj and Indeevar. The soundtrack was originally released under Vatsa Music, then acquired by Tips Music, but has recently been relocated to Zee Music Company in 2018.

References

External links

Indian remakes of American films
1996 thriller films
1996 films
Films directed by Vikram Bhatt
Films scored by Jatin–Lalit
1990s Hindi-language films
Indian psychological thriller films
Hindi-language thriller films